Andrei Paulavich Chekhauskoi (born April 7, 1979) is a retired amateur Belarusian Greco-Roman wrestler, who competed in the men's super heavyweight category. He also trained as a member of the Greco-Roman wrestling team for SKA Minsk, under his personal coach Uladzimir Primak.

Chekhauskoi qualified for the Belarusian squad in the men's super heavyweight class (120 kg) at the 2004 Summer Olympics in Athens, by receiving an allocated place from the International Wrestling Federation. Chekhauskoi suffered through a vulnerable game plan as he was immediately overpowered by Czech Republic's David Vála and could not recover his from after losing out to Russian wrestler and 2003 world champion Khasan Baroyev on his second bout, finishing third in the prelim pool and eighteenth in the overall rankings without acquiring a single point.

References

External links
 

1979 births
Living people
Belarusian male sport wrestlers
Olympic wrestlers of Belarus
Wrestlers at the 2004 Summer Olympics
Sportspeople from Minsk
20th-century Belarusian people
21st-century Belarusian people